Shoop may refer to:

Shoop (surname)
Shoop Building, a historic office building in Racine, Wisconsin, U.S.
Shoop Site (36DA20), a prehistoric archaeological site in Pennsylvania, U.S.
Shoop v. Hill, a 2019 U.S. Supreme Court case

Music
"Shoop" (song), by Salt-n-Pepa
"Exhale (Shoop Shoop)", a song by Whitney Houston
The Shoop Shoop Song (It's in His Kiss)  written and composed by Rudy Clark and recorded by many artists
Shoop Shoop Diddy Wop Cumma Cumma Wang Dang song by Monte Video and the Cassettes